Carlos Monterroso (born 28 July 1948) is a Guatemalan former footballer. He competed in the men's tournament at the 1976 Summer Olympics.

References

External links
 

1948 births
Living people
Guatemalan footballers
Guatemala international footballers
Olympic footballers of Guatemala
Footballers at the 1976 Summer Olympics
Place of birth missing (living people)
Association football defenders
C.S.D. Municipal players